Emanuel Mendel (October 28, 1839 – June 23, 1907) was a German neurologist and psychiatrist who was a university professor (from 1884 an associate professor) and director of a polyclinic in Berlin. He was born in Bunzlau, Lower Silesia; (today known as Bolesławiec, Poland) into a Jewish family.

He studied medicine in Berlin and in 1871 received his habilitation for psychiatry. Mendel was an advocate in regards to the unification of psychiatry and neurology as complementary disciplines. Among his better-known students and assistants were Max Bielschowsky (1869–1940), Edward Flatau (1869–1932), Lazar Minor (1855–1942) and Louis Jacobsohn-Lask (1863–1940)

Mendel is remembered for the introduction of duboisine, an extract from the Australian plant Dubosia myoporoides, as a treatment for Parkinson's disease. Also, he conducted important studies of epilepsy and progressive paralysis.

Among his medical writings was a textbook on psychiatry titled Leitfaden der Psychiatrie für Studirende der Medizin (1902), later translated into English and published as "Text-book of psychiatry : A psychological study of insanity for practitioners and students". Also, he was founder and publisher of the neurological/psychiatric magazine Neurologisches Centralblatt.

Mendel was interested in politics, and was a member of the Reichstag from 1877 to 1881.

References

Notes
  Parts of this article are based on translations of articles from the German and Polish Wikipedia.
 
 

1839 births
1907 deaths
People from Bolesławiec
People from the Province of Silesia
Jewish German politicians
19th-century German Jews
German Progress Party politicians
Members of the 3rd Reichstag of the German Empire
Members of the 4th Reichstag of the German Empire
Jewish psychiatrists
German psychiatrists
Jewish physicians
German neurologists
Academic staff of the Humboldt University of Berlin